John Joseph O'Shaughnessy was an Irish politician and farmer. He was first elected to Dáil Éireann at the 1932 general election as a Farmers' Party Teachta Dála (TD) for the Limerick constituency.

After the 1932 general election, O'Shaughnessy along all other sitting Farmers' Party TDs joined the newly formed National Centre Party and they contested the 1933 general election under that banner; however O'Shaughnessy was not re-elected at that election. He was elected as a Fine Gael TD at the 1937 general election, but lost his seat at the 1938 general election.

References

Year of birth missing
Year of death missing
Farmers' Party (Ireland) TDs
National Centre Party (Ireland) TDs
Fine Gael TDs
Members of the 7th Dáil
Members of the 9th Dáil
Politicians from County Limerick
Irish farmers